Coprinopsis lagopus is a species of fungus in the family Psathyrellaceae. Until 2001, the species was known as Coprinus lagopus; advances in the understanding of phylogenetic relationships between the various coprinoid species led to a major reorganization of that genus. It is a delicate and short-lived fungus, the fruit bodies lasting only a few hours before dissolving into a black ink – a process called deliquescence. The vague resemblance of the young fruit body to the paw of a white rabbit has earned this species the common name harefoot mushroom.

Description

The fruit body size of Coprinopsis lagopus can vary tremendously. This fungus gives rise to very small fruit bodies (known as dwarf fruit-bodies), some of which are less than one-hundredth the size of the larger ones. Buller noted that the dwarf fruit-bodies are fully functional, producing and liberating spores in a manner identical with normal ones. The great variation in size has led some authors to erroneously name the dwarf fruit-bodies as new species. For example, George Edward Massee considered the dwarfs to be a new species, Coprinus radiatus. The thickness of the stem in the larger specimens is typically 4–6 mm thick, up to 0.8 mm thick at the club-shaped or bulbous base.

The color of the cap surface is pale to very dark-brown at center beneath the whitish to silvery grey veil but becomes paler towards the margin. As the mushroom matures, the shape of the cap becomes more conical or convex, and finally flattens out, with edges curved upward. The veil is initially whitish, then turns to a silvery grey or grey-brown; it eventually splits up, becoming hairy (fibrillose). The gills are freely attached to the stem, very thin and crowded closely together. Initially, the color of the gills is white, then progresses to grayish-brown then to black as the spores mature. In maturity the gill edges dissolve (deliquesce) into a black liquid.  

These mushrooms are evanescent, lasting only a few hours before dying; the autodigestive process is enhanced in humid environments. The stem is whitish in color, and is hollow, hairy (flocculose) over the whole surface but especially at lower parts, and becomes smooth (glabrous) with age. The spore print is violet-black.

The species is nonpoisonous. Its edibility is unknown but it is considered too small to be worthwhile.

Microscopic features
Spores have dimensions of 11–13 x 6–8 μm. They are ellipsoid or ovoid in shape, with a rounded base and apex, dark red-brown in color, and nonamyloid.

The cystidia found on the sides of the gills (pleurocystidia) are abundant in large fruit bodies, fewer in number in the smaller specimens. These cells are oval, rounded at the apex with a bulge in the middle, and contracted into a stalk at the base. The length of these cells is typically 100–130 μm, with a width of 35–45 μm. Before the cap expands, each cystidium completely branches an interlamellar space, with both ends attached to the gills, help together by clasping paraphyses. As the gill expands the cystidium breaks away from one gill and projects from the other gill. The basidia (spore-bearing cells) comes in two sizes; long basidia have dimensions of 40 × 8–10 μm, while the shorter basidia have dimensions of 23 × 8–10 μm. The basidia have four spores, which are attached by short sterigmata.

Habitat and distribution
Coprinopsis lagopus grows solitarily or in groups in soil as well as on wood chips, compost heaps, vegetable refuse, horse dung, or cattle dung from autumn to mid-winter. It has a widespread distribution throughout the world.

Similar species
The related species Coprinopsis lagopides (P. Karst) Redhead, Vilgalys & Montcalvo is similar in appearance, but more typically grows on a substrates like humus, or burnt or charred wood; it also tends to deliquesce more quickly and completely than C. lagopus. C. lagopides may be distinguished microscopically by its smaller spores (6–9 by 5–7 μm) that are roughly spherical or ovoid in shape, rather than elliptical as in C. lagopus.

Bioactive compounds
Coprinopsis lagopus produces four sesquiterpene compounds that are collectively named lagopodins, which have some antibiotic activity. A total synthesis of lagopodin A was achieved in 2006.

Genetics
Coprinopis lagopus has been used as a model system for studying mushroom physiology and genetics for many decades.

See also

List of Coprinopsis species

References

Cited texts
 Buller AHR. (1924). Researches on Fungi. New York: Longmans, Green, and Co.

Fungi of North America
Fungi of Europe
lagopus
Fungi described in 1821
Taxa named by Elias Magnus Fries